Chastity Belt is an American rock band formed in Walla Walla, Washington, in 2010. Consisting of Julia Shapiro, Lydia Lund, Annie Truscott and Gretchen Grimm, the band plays a style of alternative rock, rock and roll, noise pop, and pop rock. The group have released four studio albums: No Regerts (2013), Time to Go Home (2015), I Used to Spend So Much Time Alone (2017), and Chastity Belt (2019).

History
Chastity Belt was formed in Walla Walla, Washington, during 2010 while its members were students at Whitman College.  Childbirth frontwoman Julia Shapiro became the band's lead vocalist and guitarist, with fellow lead guitarist Lydia Lund, bassist Annie Truscott, and drummer Gretchen Grimm. They take a humorous approach to feminine stereotypes and customs in their lyrics, challenging gender norms and femininity as a construct.

Following the EPs Fuck Chastity Belt and Dude (a collaboration with Dude York) in 2012, the group released its debut studio album No Regerts on August 13, 2013, on Help Yourself Records.
The band's second studio album, Time to Go Home, was released on March 24, 2015, on Hardly Art. It received a positive reception from music critics.

The band's third studio album, I Used to Spend So Much Time Alone, was released on June 2, 2017, also on Hardly Art. The album received significant praise from NPR's Mike Katzif, who wrote, "I Used To Spend So Much Time Alone is a thoughtful, reflective album, constantly searching for direction to and questioning every solitary, restless feeling, yet it's that intimacy that allows us to know a new, perhaps truer side to the artists. It takes an extraordinary amount of self-confidence to expose that process for all to hear."

After a brief hiatus in 2018, the group announced on July 10, 2019, that its fourth LP would be self-titled as Chastity Belt, and would be released on September 20. The single "Ann's Jam" was released along with the announcement. Writing for The Fader, Alex Robert Ross called it "the indie four-piece's lushest and most mournful-sounding album yet." Upon its release, Pitchforks Abby Jones described the album as "their dreamiest and most tranquil." The group went on a tour as direct support for the rock musician Kurt Vile in 2021.

Members
Current members
 Julia Shapiro – lead vocals, rhythm guitar
 Lydia Lund – lead guitar
 Annie Truscott – bass
 Gretchen Grimm – drums

Discography
Studio albums
 No Regerts (August 13, 2013, Help Yourself)
 Time to Go Home (March 24, 2015, Hardly Art)
 I Used to Spend So Much Time Alone (June 2, 2017, Hardly Art)
 Chastity Belt (September 20, 2019, Hardly Art)

References

External links
 Official Facebook page

Hardly Art artists
All-female bands
Rock music groups from Washington (state)
2010 establishments in Washington (state)
Musical groups established in 2010
Feminist musicians
Women in Washington (state)